The 2015 Women's Dubai Sevens was the opening tournament of the 2015–16 World Rugby Women's Sevens Series. It was held on 3–4 December 2015 at The Sevens Stadium in Dubai, and was the fourth edition of the Women's Dubai Sevens as part of the World Rugby Women's Sevens Series.

Format
The teams are drawn into three pools of four teams each. Each team plays every other team in their pool once. The top two teams from each pool advance to the Cup/Plate brackets while the top 2 third place teams also compete in the Cup/Plate. The other teams from each group play-off for the Bowl.

Teams
The participating teams and schedule were announced on 15 October 2014.

Pool stage

Pool A

Pool B

Pool C

Knockout stage

Bowl

Plate

Cup

References

External links
 HSBC Women's Sevens Website

2015–16
2015–16 World Rugby Women's Sevens Series
rugby union
2015 in women's rugby union
2015 rugby sevens competitions
2015 in Asian rugby union